I've Had Enough may refer to:

 "I've Had Enough" (Wings song), from the 1978 album London Town
 "I've Had Enough" (Earth, Wind & Fire song), from the 1981 album Raise!
 "I've Had Enough" (The Who song), from the 1973 album Quadrophenia

See also
 Had Enough (disambiguation)
 "I've Had Enough (Into the Fire)", song from the 1984 Kiss album Animalize
 Let Me Up (I've Had Enough), 1987 album by Tom Petty and the Heartbreakers